Valmore Bienvenue KC (July 12, 1894 – February 19, 1952) was a lawyer and political figure in Quebec. He represented Bellechasse in the Legislative Assembly of Quebec from 1939 to 1948 as a Liberal. Bienvenue was Speaker of the Legislative Assembly in 1942.

He was born in Nashua, New Hampshire, the son of Hormisdas Bienvenue and Angéline Beaupré. Bienvenue was educated at the Collège Sacré-Coeur in Saint-Hyacinthe, at the Séminaire Saint-Charles Borromée and the Université Laval. He was called to the Quebec bar in 1917 and set up practice in Quebec City. Bienvenue practised in partnership with Élisée Thériault, Oscar Drouin, Henri-Paul Drouin and Jean Lesage. He was named King's Counsel in 1927. Bienvenue served in the provincial cabinet as Minister of Hunting and Fishing from 1942 to 1944. He was defeated when he ran for reelection in 1948. He served as judge in the Quebec Superior Court for Quebec district from 1950 to 1952.

Bienvenue was married twice: first to Eugénie Masse and then, in 1925, to Charlotte Langlois. He died in Hull at the age of 57 and was buried in the Cimetière Notre-Dame-de-Belmont at Sainte-Foy.

His son Jean Bienvenue also served in the Quebec assembly.

References 
 

Presidents of the National Assembly of Quebec
Politicians from Nashua, New Hampshire
Quebec Liberal Party MNAs
Judges in Quebec
Canadian King's Counsel
1894 births
1952 deaths
Vice Presidents of the National Assembly of Quebec
Université Laval alumni
American emigrants to Canada